The  are a group of islands in the Seto Inland Sea, under the administration of Hiroshima Prefecture and Ehime Prefecture. Some of the largest islands in archipelago are connected by the Nishiseto Expressway bridge system connecting Honshu and Shikoku. 

A narrower definition of the archipelago only includes the islands between the former provinces of Iyo and Bizen. The islands of in Hiroshima Bay, most notably Etajima and Kurahashi-jima, are therefore excluded from the latter definition.

Economy and industry
Due to the calm yet deep waters of the Seto Inland Sea, the Geiyo Islands are one of the main hubs of shipbuilding, fishing, and aquaculture in Japan.

List of islands
The largest islands in the group, each with an area of more than 20 km2, are:
Hakata
Ikuchi-jima
Innoshima
Mukaishima
Ōmishima
Ōsakikamijima
Ōshima
Other notable islands in the group include:
Nii Ōshima
Okamura
Ōkunoshima
Tsushima
Uoshima
The following islands may sometimes be included under the archipelago's broader definition:
Etajima
Itsukushima
Kurahashi-jima
Ninoshima

Gallery

References

External links
Navigating the Geiyo Islands at NASA Earth Observatory, April 30, 2022

 
Archipelagoes of Japan
Islands of Hiroshima Prefecture
Islands of Ehime Prefecture
Islands of the Seto Inland Sea
Archipelagoes of the Pacific Ocean